The Yeti is an ape-like creature purported to inhabit the Himalayan mountain range in Asia. In western popular culture, the creature is commonly referred to as the Abominable Snowman. Many dubious articles have been offered in an attempt to prove the existence of the Yeti, including anecdotal visual sightings, disputed video recordings, photographs, and plaster casts of large footprints. Some of these are speculated or known to be hoaxes.

Folklorists trace the origin of the Yeti to a combination of factors, including Sherpa folklore and misidentified fauna such as bear or yak. The Yeti is commonly compared to Bigfoot of North America, as the two subjects often have similar physical descriptions.

Description

The Yeti is often described as being a large, bipedal ape-like creature that is covered with brown, gray, or white hair, and it is sometimes depicted as having large, sharp teeth.

Etymology and alternative names

Pranavananda states that the words "ti", "te" and "teh" are derived from the spoken word 'tre' (spelled "dred"), Tibetan for bear, with the 'r' so softly pronounced as to be almost inaudible, thus making it "te" or "teh".

Tibetan lore describes three main varieties of yetis—the Nyalmo, which has black fur and is the largest and fiercest, standing around fifteen feet tall; the Chuti, which stands around eight feet tall and lives 8000 to 10000 feet above sea level; and the Rang Shim Bombo, which has reddish-brown fur and is only three to five feet tall.

Other terms used by Himalayan peoples do not translate exactly the same, but refer to legendary and indigenous wildlife:

 Michê translates as "man-bear".
 Dzu-teh – 'dzu' translates as "cattle" and the full meaning translates as "cattle bear", referring to the Himalayan brown bear.
 Migoi or Mi-go translates as "wild man".
 Bun Manchi – Nepali for "jungle man" that is used outside Sherpa communities where yeti is the common name.
 Mirka – Another name for "wild-man". Local legend holds that "anyone who sees one dies or is killed". The latter is taken from a written statement by Frank Smythe's sherpas in 1937.
 Kang Admi – "Snow Man".
 Xueren (Chinese: 雪人) - "Snow Man"

Other names and locations
In Russian folklore, the Chuchuna is an entity said to dwell in Siberia.  It has been described as six to seven feet tall and covered with dark hair.  According to the native accounts from the nomadic Yakut and Tungus tribes, it is a well built, Neanderthal-like man wearing pelts and bearing a white patch of fur on its forearms. It is said to occasionally consume human flesh, unlike their close cousins, the Almastis.  Some witnesses reported seeing a tail on the creature's corpse. It is described as being roughly six to seven feet tall. There are additional tales of large, reclusive, bipedal creatures worldwide, notably including both "Bigfoot" and the "Abominable Snowman."

The Abominable Snowman
The name Abominable Snowman was coined in 1921, the year Lieutenant-Colonel Charles Howard-Bury led the 1921 British Mount Everest reconnaissance expedition, which he chronicled in Mount Everest The Reconnaissance, 1921. In the book, Howard-Bury includes an account of crossing the Lhagpa La at  where he found footprints that he believed "were probably caused by a large 'loping' grey wolf, which in the soft snow formed double tracks rather like those of a bare-footed man". He adds that his Sherpa guides "at once volunteered that the tracks must be that of 'The Wild Man of the Snows', to which they gave the name 'metoh-kangmi. "Metoh" translates as "man-bear" and "kang-mi" translates as "snowman".

Confusion exists between Howard-Bury's recitation of the term "metoh-kangmi" and the term used in Bill Tilman's book Mount Everest, 1938 where Tilman had used the words "metch", which does not exist in the Tibetan language, and "kangmi" when relating the coining of the term "Abominable Snowman". Further evidence of "metch" being a misnomer is provided by Tibetan language authority Professor David Snellgrove from the School of Oriental and African Studies at the University of London (ca. 1956), who dismissed the word "metch" as impossible, because the consonants "t-c-h" cannot be conjoined in the Tibetan language. Documentation suggests that the term "metch-kangmi" is derived from one source (from the year 1921). It has been suggested that "metch" is simply a misspelling of "metoh".

The use of "Abominable Snowman" began when Henry Newman, a longtime contributor to The Statesman in Calcutta, writing under the pen name "Kim", interviewed the porters of the "Everest Reconnaissance expedition" on their return to Darjeeling. Newman mistranslated the word "metoh" as "filthy", substituting the term "abominable", perhaps out of artistic licence. As author Bill Tilman recounts, "[Newman] wrote long after in a letter to The Times: The whole story seemed such a joyous creation I sent it to one or two newspapers".

History and sightings

Pre-19th century
According to H. Siiger, the Yeti was a part of the pre-Buddhist beliefs of several Himalayan people. He was told that the Lepcha people worshipped a "Glacier Being" as a God of the Hunt. He also reported that followers of the Bön religion once believed the blood of the "mi rgod" or "wild man" had use in certain spiritual ceremonies. The being was depicted as an ape-like creature who carries a large stone as a weapon and makes a whistling swoosh sound.

Yeti was adopted into Tibetan Buddhism, where it is considered a nonhuman animal (tiragyoni) that is nonetheless human enough to sometimes be able to follow Dharma. Several stories feature Yetis becoming helpers and disciples to religious figures. In Tibet, images of Yetis are paraded and occasionally worshipped as guardians against evil spirits. However, because Yetis sometimes act as enforcers of Dharma, hearing or seeing one is often considered a bad omen, for which the witness must accumulate merit.

19th century

In 1832, James Prinsep's Journal of the Asiatic Society of Bengal published trekker B. H. Hodgson's account of his experiences in northern Nepal. His local guides spotted a tall bipedal creature covered with long dark hair, which seemed to flee in fear. Hodgson concluded it was an orangutan.

An early record of reported footprints appeared in 1899 in Laurence Waddell's Among the Himalayas. Waddell reported his guide's description of a large apelike creature that left the prints, which Waddell thought were made by a bear. Waddell heard stories of bipedal, apelike creatures but wrote that "none, however, of the many Tibetans I have interrogated on this subject could ever give me an authentic case. On the most superficial investigation, it always resolved into something that somebody heard tell of."

20th century
The frequency of reports increased during the early 20th century when Westerners began making determined attempts to scale the many mountains in the area and occasionally reported seeing odd creatures or strange tracks.

In 1925, N. A. Tombazi, a photographer and member of the Royal Geographical Society, writes that he saw a creature at about  near Zemu Glacier. "Unquestionably, the figure in outline was exactly like a human being, walking upright and stopping occasionally to pull at some dwarf rhododendron bushes. It showed up dark against the snow, and as far as I could make out, wore no clothes." About two hours later, Tombazi and his companions descended the mountain and saw the creature's prints, described as "similar in shape to those of a man, but only six to seven inches long by four inches wide... The prints were undoubtedly those of a biped."

Western interest in the Yeti peaked dramatically in the 1950s. These photos have been subject to intense scrutiny and debate. Some argue they are the best evidence of Yeti's existence, while others contend the prints are those of a mundane creature that have been distorted by the melting snow.

Peter Byrne reported finding a yeti footprint in 1948, in northern Sikkim, India near the Zemu Glacier, while on holiday from a Royal Air Force assignment in India.

In 1953, Sir Edmund Hillary and Tenzing Norgay reported seeing large footprints while scaling Mount Everest. Hillary would later discount Yeti reports as unreliable. In his first autobiography Tenzing said that he believed the Yeti was a large ape, and although he had never seen it himself his father had seen one twice, but in his second autobiography he said he had become much more sceptical about its existence.

During the Daily Mail Snowman Expedition of 1954, the mountaineering leader John Angelo Jackson made the first trek from Everest to Kanchenjunga in the course of which he photographed symbolic paintings of the Yeti at Tengboche gompa. Jackson tracked and photographed many footprints in the snow, most of which were identifiable. However, there were many large footprints which could not be identified. These flattened footprint-like indentations were attributed to erosion and subsequent widening of the original footprint by wind and particles.

On 19 March 1954, the Daily Mail printed an article which described expedition teams obtaining hair specimens from what was alleged to be a Yeti scalp found in the Pangboche monastery. The hairs were black to dark brown in colour in dim light, and fox red in sunlight. The hair was analysed by Professor Frederic Wood Jones, an expert in human and comparative anatomy. During the study, the hairs were bleached, cut into sections and analysed microscopically. The research consisted of taking microphotographs of the hairs and comparing them with hairs from known animals such as bears and orangutans. Jones concluded that the hairs were not actually from a scalp. He contended that while some animals do have a ridge of hair extending from the pate to the back, no animals have a ridge (as in the Pangboche scalp) running from the base of the forehead across the pate and ending at the nape of the neck. Jones was unable to pinpoint exactly the animal from which the Pangboche hairs were taken. He was, however, convinced that the hairs were not from a bear or anthropoid ape, but instead from the shoulder of a coarse-haired hoofed animal.

Sławomir Rawicz claimed in his book The Long Walk, published in 1956, that as he and some others were crossing the Himalayas in the winter of 1940, their path was blocked for hours by two bipedal animals that were doing seemingly nothing but shuffling around in the snow.

Beginning in 1957, the Texas oil businessman and adventurer Tom Slick led an expedition to the Nepal Himalayas to investigate Yeti reports, with the anthropologist prof. Carleton S. Coon as one of its members. In 1959, supposed Yeti feces were collected by one of Slick's expeditions; fecal analysis found a parasite which could not be classified. The United States government thought that finding the Yeti was likely enough to create three rules for American expeditions searching for it: obtain a Nepalese permit, do not harm the Yeti except in self-defense, and let the Nepalese government approve any news reporting on the animal's discovery. In 1959, actor James Stewart, while visiting India, reportedly smuggled the so-called Pangboche Hand, by concealing it in his luggage when he flew from India to London.

In 1960, Sir Edmund Hillary mounted the 1960–61 Silver Hut expedition to the Himalayas, which was to collect and analyse physical evidence of the Yeti. Hillary borrowed a supposed Yeti scalp from the Khumjung monastery then himself and Khumjo Chumbi (the village headman), brought the scalp back to London where a small sample was cut off for testing. Marca Burns made a detailed examination of the sample of skin and hair from the margin of the alleged Yeti scalp and compared it with similar samples from the serow, blue bear and black bear. Burns concluded the sample "was probably made from the skin of an animal closely resembling the sampled specimen of Serow, but definitely not identical with it: possibly a local variety or race of the same species, or a different but closely related species."

Up to the 1960s, belief in the yeti was relatively common in Bhutan and in 1966 a Bhutanese stamp was made to honour the creature. However, in the twenty-first century belief in the being has declined.

In 1970, British mountaineer Don Whillans claimed to have witnessed a creature when scaling Annapurna. He reported that he once saw it moving on all fours.

In 1983, Himalayan conservationist Daniel C. Taylor and Himalayan natural historian Robert L. Fleming Jr. led a yeti expedition into Nepal's Barun Valley (suggested by discovery in the Barun in 1972 of footprints alleged to be yeti by Cronin & McNeely). The Taylor-Fleming expedition also discovered similar yeti-like footprints (hominoid appearing with both a hallux and bipedal gait), intriguing large nests in trees, and vivid reports from local villagers of two bears, rukh bhalu ('tree bear', small, reclusive, weighing about ) and bhui bhalu ('ground bear', aggressive, weighing up to ). Further interviews across Nepal gave evidence of local belief in two different bears. Skulls were collected, these were compared to known skulls at the Smithsonian Institution, American Museum of Natural History, and British Museum, and confirmed identification of a single species, the Asiatic black bear, showing no morphological difference between 'tree bear' and 'ground bear.' (This despite an intriguing skull in the British Museum of a 'tree bear' collected in 1869 by Oldham and discussed in the Annals of the Royal Zoological Society.)

21st century
In 2004, Henry Gee, editor of the journal Nature, mentioned the Yeti as an example of folk belief deserving further study, writing, "The discovery that Homo floresiensis survived until so very recently, in geological terms, makes it more likely that stories of other mythical, human-like creatures such as Yetis are founded on grains of truth."

In early December 2007, American television presenter Joshua Gates and his team (Destination Truth) reported finding a series of footprints in the Everest region of Nepal resembling descriptions of Yeti. Casts were made of the prints for further research. The footprints were examined by Jeffrey Meldrum of Idaho State University, who believed them to be too morphologically accurate to be fake or man-made, before changing his mind after making further investigations. Later in 2009, in a TV show, Gates presented hair samples with a forensic analyst concluding that the hair contained an unknown DNA sequence.

On 25 July 2008, the BBC reported that hairs collected in the remote Garo Hills area of North-East India by Dipu Marak had been analysed at Oxford Brookes University in the UK by primatologist Anna Nekaris and microscopy expert Jon Wells. These initial tests were inconclusive, and ape conservation expert Ian Redmond told the BBC that there was similarity between the cuticle pattern of these hairs and specimens collected by Edmund Hillary during Himalayan expeditions in the 1950s and donated to the Oxford University Museum of Natural History, and announced planned DNA analysis. This analysis has since revealed that the hair came from the Himalayan goral.

A group of Chinese scientists and explorers in 2010 proposed to renew searches in the Shennongjia Forestry District of Hubei province, which was the site of expeditions in the 1970s and 1980s.

At a 2011 conference in Russia, participating scientists and enthusiasts declared having "95% evidence" of the Yeti's existence. However, this claim was disputed later; American anthropologist and anatomist Jeffrey Meldrum, who was present during the Russian expedition, claimed the "evidence" found was simply an attempt by local officials to drum up publicity.

A yeti was reportedly captured in Russia in December 2011. Initially the story claimed that a hunter reported having seen a bear-like creature, trying to kill one of his sheep, but after he fired his gun, the creature ran into a forest on two legs. The story then claimed that border patrol soldiers captured a hairy two-legged female creature similar to a gorilla that ate meat and vegetation. This was later revealed as a hoax or possibly a publicity stunt for charity.

In April 2019, an Indian army mountaineering expedition team claimed to have spotted mysterious 'Yeti' footprints, measuring 81 by 38 centimetres (32 by 15 in), near the Makalu base camp.

Proposed explanations
The misidentification of Himalayan wildlife has been proposed as an explanation for some Yeti sightings, including the chu-teh, a langur monkey living at lower altitudes; the Tibetan blue bear; or the Himalayan brown bear or dzu-teh, also known as the Himalayan red bear.

A well publicized expedition to Bhutan initially reported that a hair sample had been obtained which by DNA analysis by Professor Bryan Sykes could not be matched to any known animal. Analysis completed after the media release, however, clearly showed the samples were from a brown bear (Ursus arctos) and an Asiatic black bear (Ursus thibetanus).

In 1986, South Tyrolean mountaineer Reinhold Messner claimed in his autobiography My Quest for the Yeti that the Yeti is actually the endangered Himalayan brown bear, Ursus arctos isabellinus, or Tibetan blue bear, U. a. pruinosus, which can walk both upright or on all fours.

The 1983 Barun Valley discoveries prompted three years of research on the 'tree bear' possibility by Taylor, Fleming, John Craighead and Tirtha Shrestha. From that research the conclusion was that the Asiatic black bear, when about two years old, spends much time in trees to avoid attack by larger male bears on the ground ('ground bears'). During this tree period that may last two years, young bears train their inner claw outward, allowing an opposable grip. The imprint in the snow of a hind paw coming over the front paw that appears to have a hallux, especially when the bear is going slightly uphill so the hind paw print extends the overprint backward makes a hominoid-appearing track, both in that it is elongated like a human foot but with a "thumb" and in that a four-footed animal's gait now appears bipedal.  This "yeti discovery", in the words of National Geographic Magazine editor Bill Garrett, "[by] on-site research sweeps away much of the 'smoke and mirrors' and gives us a believable yeti".

This fieldwork in Nepal's Barun Valley led directly to initiating in 1984 Makalu-Barun National Park that protected over half a million acres in 1991, and across the border with China the Qomolangma national nature preserve in the Tibet Autonomous Region that protected over six million acres. In the words of Honorary President of the American Alpine Club, Robert H. Bates, this yeti discovery "has apparently solved the mystery of the yeti, or at least part of it, and in so doing added to the world's great wildlife preserves" such that the shy animal that lives in trees (and not the high snows), and mysteries and myths of the Himalayas that it represents, can continue within a protected area nearly the size of Switzerland.

In 2003, Japanese researcher and mountaineer Dr. Makoto Nebuka published the results of his twelve-year linguistic study, postulating that the word "Yeti" is a corruption of the word "meti", a regional dialect term for a "bear". Nebuka claims that ethnic Tibetans fear and worship the bear as a supernatural being. Nebuka's claims were subject to almost immediate criticism, and he was accused of linguistic carelessness. Dr. Raj Kumar Pandey, who has researched both Yetis and mountain languages, said "it is not enough to blame tales of the mysterious beast of the Himalayas on words that rhyme but mean different things."

Some speculate these reported creatures could be present-day specimens of the extinct giant ape Gigantopithecus. However, the Yeti is generally described as bipedal, and most scientists believe Gigantopithecus to have been quadrupedal, and so massive that, unless it evolved specifically as a bipedal ape (like the hominids), walking upright would have been even more difficult for the now extinct primate than it is for its extant quadrupedal relative, the orangutan.

In 2013, a call was put out by scientists from the universities of Oxford and Lausanne for people claiming to have samples from these sorts of creatures. A mitochondrial DNA analysis of the 12S RNA gene was undertaken on samples of hair from an unidentified animal from Ladakh in northern India on the west of the Himalayas, and one from Bhutan. These samples were compared with those in GenBank, the international repository of gene sequences, and matched a sample from an ancient polar bear jawbone found in Svalbard, Norway, that dates back to between 40,000 and 120,000 years ago. The result suggests that, barring hoaxes of planted samples or contamination, bears in these regions may have been taken to be yeti. Professor of evolutionary genetics at the University of Cambridge Bill Amos doubted the samples were of polar bears in the Himalayas, but was "90% convinced that there is a bear in these regions that has been mistaken for a yeti". Professor Bryan Sykes whose team carried out the analysis of the samples at Oxford university has his own theory. He believes that the samples may have come from a hybrid species of bear produced from a mating between a brown bear and a polar bear. A research of 12S rRNA published in 2015 revealed that the hair samples collected are most likely those of brown bears. In 2017, a new analysis compared mtDNA sequences of bears from the region with DNA extracted from hair and other samples claimed to have come from yeti. It included hair thought to be from the same preserved specimen as the anomalous Sykes sample, and showed it to have been a Himalayan brown bear, while other purported yeti samples were actually from the Tibetan blue bear, Asiatic black bear and a domestic dog.

In 2017, Daniel C. Taylor published a comprehensive analysis of the century-long Yeti literature, giving added evidence to the (Ursus thibetanus) explanation building on the initial Barun Valley discoveries. Importantly, this book under the Oxford University imprint gave a meticulous explanation for the iconic Yeti footprint photographed by Eric Shipton in 1950, also the 1972 Cronin-McNeely print, as well all other unexplained Yeti footprints. To complete this explanation, Taylor also located a never-before published photograph in the archives of the Royal Geographical Society, taken in 1950 by Eric Shipton, that included scratches that are clearly bear nail marks.

In popular culture

The Himalayan nation Nepal selected Yeti as the mascot for the Visit Nepal 2020.

The Yeti has regularly been depicted in films, literature, music, and video games.

 Films and television
 The Snow Creature (1954), film directed by W. Lee Wilder
 The Creature (1955), television play written by Nigel Kneale and directed by Rudolph Cartier. Later remade by Hammer Horror in 1957 as The Abominable Snowman.
 Half Human, or Beast Man Snow Man (1955), film directed by Ishiro Honda
 The Abominable Snowman, a 1955 episode of Colonel March of Scotland Yard in which members of a British mountaineering club are being menaced by a Yeti.
 Man Beast (1956), film directed by Jerry Warren
 The Abominable Snowman (1957), film directed by Val Guest
 The Abominable Snow Rabbit (1961), animated short film directed by Chuck Jones and Maurice Noble
 Bumble is the Abominable Snow Monster from the 1964 Christmas television special Rudolph the Red-Nosed Reindeer. He later influenced the portrayal of the yeti who appeared near the end of the film Monsters, Inc.
 Jonny Quest, episode 25 Monsters In the Monastery (1965), animated science fiction adventure television series
 In the Doctor Who serials The Abominable Snowmen (1967) and The Web of Fear (1968), multiple robotic yeti are used as servants of the Great Intelligence, the main antagonist of both stories.
 Shriek of the Mutilated (1974), film directed by Michael Findlay
 Yeti: Giant of the 20th Century, a 1977 Italian-Canadian giant monster film directed by Gianfranco Parolini (as Frank Kramer), co-written by Parolini, Marcello Coscia, and Mario di Nardo
 The Werewolf and the Yeti (1975), film directed by Miguel Iglesias Bonns, starring Paul Naschy
 Ajooba Kudrat Ka (1991), film directed by Shyam Ramsay and Tulsi Ramsay
 Monsters, Inc. (2001), animated film directed by Peter Docter, when the main characters are stranded in the Himalayas and are rescued by a friendly Abominable Snowman (voiced by John Ratzenberger) who was among the monsters exiled from Monstropolis.
 Yeti: A Love Story (2006), film directed by Adam Deyoe and Eric Gosselin
 Lissi und der wilde Kaiser (2007), German animation film, directed by Michael Herbig
 Yeti: Curse of the Snow Demon (2008), telefilm directed by Paul Ziller
 Snow Beast (2011) film starring John Schneider
 Abominable Christmas (2012), animated telefilm directed by Chad Van De Keere
 Yoko (2012), film directed by Franziska Buch
 The Disney XD Series Pair of Kings episode "Yeti, Set, Snow" features a tribe of Yetis who live on the snow-capped mountains of Kinkow and are one of the known tribes there.
 In 2016 the Travel Channel released, in the series Expedition Unknown, a special four-part episode titled "Hunt for the Yeti":
 In the Bengali film Yeti Obhijaan, there is a prologue of gigantic teeth which, as of Yeti, is a primary plot point. Also there are different sightings and PoVs (like Tintin in Tibet) of Yeti is shown through the movie.
 Smallfoot (2018), animated film directed by Karey Kirkpatrick and Jason Reisig, is focused on the Yetis. This depiction of the Yeti has them at 20 ft with no visible noses and horns on their heads.
 Abominable (2019), animated film directed by Jill Culton and Todd Wilderman, has a young Yeti named Everest (vocal effects provided by Joseph Izzo) as a central character. The adult Yetis are shown to around 30 ft.
 Missing Link (2019), animated film directed by Chris Butler, features a kingdom of Yeti that live in the Himalayas that are led by a paranoid Yeti elder (voiced by Emma Thompson).
 An episode of The Loud House titled "Snow News Day" detailed an Abominable Snowman sighting in Royal Woods. When it gets photographed by the Action News Team in his absence, Liam Hunnicutt later recognizes it as his long-lost sheep Roxanne (vocal effects provided by Audrey Wasilewski) who was trained to walk on its hind legs and has overgrown wool. With help from Lincoln Loud, Clyde McBride, Rusty Spokes, Zach Gurdle, and Stella Zhau, Liam had to get to Roxanne first and get rid of the overgrown wool before it can be trapped by Mr. Bolhofner on Mayor Theresa Davis' behalf as news reporter Katherine Mulligan films it. Once this was done, the Action News Team apologizes for this mix-up as Katherine Mulligan forgives them on Royal Woods behalf as she compares it to the time when she claimed that radioactive mutants were attacking City Hall.

 Literature
 Alternate history author Harry Turtledove has written stories as part of the "State of Jefferson Stories" titled "Visitor from the East" (May 2016), "Peace is Better" (May 2016), "Typecasting" (June 2016) and "Three Men and a Sasquatch" (2019) where Yetis, Sasquatches and other related cryptids are real. However, unlike common popular depictions of such creatures as less evolved primates, they are essentially another race of human beings, and have been integrated into society.
 "Wild Man", a song by Kate Bush from her 2011 album 50 Words for Snow.
 A Yeti serves as a pivotal character in Hergé's 1958-1959 comic book Tintin in Tibet, where it is depicted as an enormous, intelligent and sensitive ape-like creature who saves and protects the young Chinese who is the only survivor of a plane crash.
 Goosebumps has a story called "The Abominable Snowman of Pasadena" where this Abominable Snowman was found in Alaska in a block of ice and can deal with the unmelting snow and ice as seen later in the story. While the Abominable Snowman was a neutral character that has brown fur, a half-human, half-gorilla face, and has the height of a hulking 11 year old, the version seen in the films Goosebumps and Goosebumps 2: Haunted Halloween was shown to be 8 ft. with white fur and an ape-like face and is loyal to Slappy the Dummy. Both adaptions are shown to like trail mix.

 Radio
 Yehti, a 1955 episode of The Goon Show written by Spike Milligan and Eric Sykes, in which protagonist Neddie Seagoon goes Yeti hunting in Yorkshire.

 Video games
 In the video game Mr. Nutz, the title character goes through a series of levels before meeting his nemesis Mr. Blizzard who is a yeti.
 In the 2006 video game Titan Quest, Yetis appear as beast enemies in Act III (Orient).
 There is an expansion to the video game Far Cry 4, named "Valley of the Yetis" dedicated to finding a relic in the Himalayas that turns people into Yetis.
 SkiFree by Chris Pirih features a yeti who can eat the player if the player reaches more than 2000m down the slope.
 The 2006 GameCube game The Legend of Zelda: Twilight Princess features a yeti couple who live in an abandoned manor atop a snow-covered mountain.
 Mega Man Star Force 2 features a boss by the name of Yeti Blizzard.

 Others
 Yeti folklore is the theme of Walt Disney World's attraction, Expedition Everest at Disney's Animal Kingdom. It features a  audio-animatronic Yeti which appears during the ride. An Abominable Snowman also appears in the Matterhorn Bobsleds attraction at Disneyland.
 Yetis is the mascot of Cleveland Community College in Shelby, North Carolina.
 Yeti Airlines is a prominent domestic airline in Nepal.

See also
 General

 Similar alleged creatures

Citations

General and cited references 
 Izzard, Ralph (1955) The Abominable Snowman Adventure. Hodder and Stoughton.
 Taylor, Daniel (1995). Something Hidden Behind the Ranges: An Himalayan Quest. San Francisco: Mercury House. .
 Tilman, H. W. (1938). Appendix B. Mount Everest 1938. Pilgrim Publishing. . pp. 127–37.

Further reading
 Ann E. Bodie, The Exploding Cow Story: Concerning the History of the Yeti Throughout the Ages, New York: St.Martin's Press,1986
 
 
 Charles Howard-Bury, Mount Everest The Reconnaissance, 1921, Edward Arnold, .
 John Angelo Jackson, More than Mountains, Chapters 10 (p. 92) & 11, Prelude to the Snowman Expedition & The Snowman Expedition, George Harrap & Co, 1954
 John Angelo Jackson, Adventure Travels in the Himalaya Chapter 17, Everest and the Elusive Snowman, 1954 updated material, Indus Publishing Company, 2005, .
 
 
 Reinhold Messner, My Quest for the Yeti: Confronting the Himalayas' Deepest Mystery, New York: St. Martin's Press, 2000, 
 
 John Napier (MRCS, IRCS, DSC) (1972). Bigfoot: The Yeti and Sasquatch in Myth and Reality pages=34–66, 126–39 .
 
 
 Gardner Soule, 1966, Trail of the Abominable Snowman, New York: G.P. Putnam's Sons, 
 Stonor, Charles (1955). The Sherpa and the Snowman. London: Hollis and Carter. Recounts the 1955 Daily Mail "Abominable Snowman Expedition" by the scientific officer of the expedition. This is a very detailed analysis of not just the "Snowman" but the flora and fauna of the Himalayas and its people.
 
 
 Sir Francis Younghusband (1926). The Epic of Mount Everest. Edward Arnold & Co.

External links

 "Yeti Legends"—National Geographic

 
Cryptids
Himalayan legendary creatures
Mythological monsters
Supernatural legends